Telegraph Cove is a community of about 20 inhabitants, on Vancouver Island in British Columbia, Canada, located approximately  northwest of Campbell River. It is a former fishing and cannery village that has become a launch point for eco-tourism. It shares the inlet with Beaver Cove which is  up the inlet.

The community grew out of a one-room station at the northern terminus of the Campbell River telegraph line built by the federal government in 1911–12.

Next to the arts and crafts gallery stands the home of community pioneer Fred Wastell, whose father purchased most of the land around the cove. Together with Japanese investors, he established a chum salmon saltery and a small sawmill.

Economy 

Today, Telegraph Cove's economy is based primarily on tourism due to its prime location on Johnstone Strait and its proximity to Robson Bight ecological reserve. Telegraph Cove serves as the send-off point for kayakers and other whale-watchers who are interested in sightings of the large number of orca whales that spend the summer months in Johnstone Strait, which separates the northern part of Vancouver Island from the rest of British Columbia.

The old fishing village of Telegraph Cove has been turned into a resort where numerous small businesses head up operations that take tourists into Johnstone Strait. Stubbs Island Charters (Telegraph Cove Whale Watch) helped put the cove on the whale watching world's radar nearly 30 years ago.

Telegraph Cove Marina and RV Park is also located at Telegraph Cove and is owned by Telegraph Cove Holdings (TCH).  Since 1991, TCH has owned 127 hectares in and surrounding Telegraph Cove excluding the old village of Telegraph Cove and excluding Telegraph Cove Resort's marina and RV park. The Telegraph Point strata subdivision is located across the cove from the historic village, and will ultimately consist of sixty-six residential homesites and six commercial sites located directly on the cove designed to match the character of the historic old town. The first three phases of residential homesites (24 lots) have been marketed and sold and there are nine houses at Telegraph Point with new homes built every year.

Improvements 
In the summer of 2006, the Telegraph Cove Road improvement project was completed, bringing a widened, realigned, and paved road all the way to Telegraph Cove.

Telegraph Cove Marina's 130 slip marina underwent a complete rebuild in 2007/2008 and has moorage for small and large vessels with potable water and power. Both Telegraph Cove Marina and Telegraph Cove Resorts' marina primarily cater to trailerable boats.

References

External links 
 https://web.archive.org/web/20060319073135/http://www.vancouverisland.com/regions/towns/?townID=76
 http://www.abcnews.go.com/GMA/Travel/story?id=3470108&page=1

Unincorporated settlements in British Columbia
Populated places in the Regional District of Mount Waddington
Northern Vancouver Island